Elżbieta  or Elžbieta may refer to:
 Elżbieta, Lublin Voivodeship, a village in eastern Poland
 Elżbieta-Kolonia, a village in eastern Poland
 Elżbieta, a Polish given name equivalent to Elizabeth
 Elžbieta, a Lithuanian given name equivalent to Elizabeth

See also 
 

Lithuanian feminine given names
Polish feminine given names